Mevlud Lobzhanidze (born 2 November 1968 in Tbilisi) is a Georgian judoka.

Achievements

References
 

1968 births
Living people
Male judoka from Georgia (country)
Judoka at the 1996 Summer Olympics
Olympic judoka of Georgia (country)
Sportspeople from Tbilisi
20th-century people from Georgia (country)